Nteboheleng Koaeana (born 17 April 1979) is a Lesotho sprinter. She competed in the women's 4 × 100 metres relay at the 1996 Summer Olympics.

References

1979 births
Living people
Athletes (track and field) at the 1996 Summer Olympics
Lesotho female sprinters
Olympic athletes of Lesotho
Place of birth missing (living people)
Olympic female sprinters